The Chkalov Transpolar Flight Monument, or simply Chkalov Monument, is a monument installed outside the Pearson Air Museum, in the Vancouver, Washington portion of the Fort Vancouver National Historic Site. The memorial commemorates , completed in 1937, and was dedicated in 1975.

References

External links

 

1975 establishments in Washington (state)
Monuments and memorials in Vancouver, Washington
Outdoor sculptures in Vancouver, Washington